"Neighbours" is s song by German synthpop group Camouflage. It was the third single from their 1988 debut album Voices & Images. It was not released as a single in the US, where "That Smiling Face" was released later in 1988.

The song was re-recorded at Dynaton Studios for its single release.

Music video
The music video for "Neighbours" features the band members strolling through a park where several young girls are playing croquet. One of their croquet balls disappears through a hoop, and another lands on a cross in the ground, and reveals a long, large zone filled with white crosses. The band stand and observe the sight.

Track listings
7" single (Germany, 1988)
 "Neighbours" (7" version) - 3:48
 "Every Now and Then" - 4:30

12" single (Europe, 1988)
 "Neighbours" (12" version) - 6:31
 "Every Now and Then" - 4:30

CD single (Europe, 1988)
 "Neighbours" (7" version) - 3:48
 "Neighbours" (12" version) - 6:31
 "Every Now and Then" - 4:30

References
http://www.discogs.com/Camouflage-Neighbours/master/7494http://www.camouflage-music.com/index.php?menu=discography&vid=3

1988 singles
Camouflage (band) songs
1987 songs
Metronome Records singles